Banbury is a market town located on the River Cherwell in northern Oxfordshire, England.  

Banbury may also refer to:

Surname/family name
 Banbury (surname)

Transport
 Banbury railway station, a railway station in Oxfordshire, England

Politics
 Banbury (UK Parliament constituency), a constituency represented in the House of Commons of the Parliament of the United Kingdom.
 Banbury Rural District, a rural district in Oxfordshire, England.
 Municipal Borough of Banbury, a Municipal Borough in Oxfordshire, England.

Ships
 , a tugboat

Places
 Banbury Oaks, California, USA
 Banbury Hot Springs, Buhl, Idaho
 Banbury, Toronto, Ontario, Canada
 Banbury, Oxfordshire, UK

Sport
 Banbury United F.C.
 Ian Banbury

Industry
  Banbury Mixers A brand of internal batch mixer.

Inventors
 Fernley H. Banbury

Miscellaneous
 "Banburies", cards used in the cryptanalytic process of Banburismus